The Scottish Football Writers' Association Footballer of the Year (often called the SFWA Footballer of the Year, or simply the Scottish Footballer of the Year) is an annual award given to the player who is adjudged to have been the best of the season in Scottish football. The award has been presented since the 1964–65 season, and the winner is selected by a vote amongst the members of the Scottish Football Writers' Association (SFWA), which comprises over 100 football journalists based throughout Scotland. The first winner was Celtic's Billy McNeill, and the first non-Scottish winner was Mark Hateley of Rangers in 1994. Seven players have won the award on more than one occasion, and one, Craig Gordon, three times, winning his third award in the 2021–22 season.

The award was instigated in 1965, eight years after the association was founded, and committee member Allan Herron was charged with obtaining the permission of the Scottish Football Association to make the first award. Each member of the association casts one vote and also nominates a runner-up. In the event of a tie for first place the number of runner-up votes is taken into consideration. Although it is the older of the two awards, the SFWA award is considered by the players themselves to be of secondary importance to the PFA Scotland Players' Player of the Year because the winner of the PFA Scotland award is chosen by his fellow professionals.

List of winners
The award has been presented on 58 occasions as of 2022, with 49 different individual players winning. Craig Gordon has won the award a record three times; six players (John Greig, Sandy Jardine, Brian Laudrup, Henrik Larsson, Barry Ferguson and Leigh Griffiths) have won the award twice; and on one occasion the award was presented collectively to the Scotland national squad. The table also indicates where the winning player also won the PFA Scotland Players' Player of the Year award (SPFA). In 2012–13, Leigh Griffiths became the first player to win the SFWA award and the PFA Scotland Young Player of the Year award in the same season.

Breakdown of winners

Winners by country

Winners by club

See also
PFA Scotland Players' Player of the Year
PFA Scotland Young Player of the Year
PFA Scotland Team of the Year
PFA Players' Player of the Year
FWA Footballer of the Year
PFAI Players' Player of the Year
Rex Kingsley Footballer of the Year
SFWA International Player of the Year
SFWA Manager of the Year
SFWA Young Player of the Year

Notes

References

Scotland
Scottish football trophies and awards
Awards established in 1964
1964 establishments in Scotland
Annual events in Scotland
Annual sporting events in the United Kingdom